St Stephen's Church is an Anglican church in Bournemouth, Dorset (formerly in Hampshire). The liturgical life of the Church is rooted in the Anglo-Catholic tradition. The Church has a noted Lady Chapel, and celebrates Marian masses, benediction and recitation of the Rosary for the Society of Mary. Devotion to Our Lady of Walsingham is also common.

The church is close to Bournemouth Town Centre and Meyrick Park.

Background

Designed by architect John Loughborough Pearson, as a memorial to Alexander Morden Bennett, first vicar of St Peter's Church, Bournemouth. The church is constructed with Purbeck stone and Bath stone. Its nave was built from 1881 to 1883 and the chancel was built from 1896 to 1897. The tower was built from 1907 to 1908. It is a Grade I-listed building.

Vicars

1881–1911 Fr Alexander Sykes Bennett
1911–28 Fr George Philip Trevelyan
1928–44 Fr Philip Harold Rogers
1944–52 Fr Geoffrey Heald
1952–58 Fr Francis John Michael Dean
1958–62 Fr Charles Edward Burnett Neate
1962–70 Fr George Percy Wilkins
1970–73 Fr Anthony Douglas Caesar
1974–83 Fr John David Corbett
1983–87 Fr John Catlin
1987–94 Fr Paul Hastrop
1994–2012 Fr Robin Harger
2009–2023 Fr Ian Terry (Rector)

Music
The church has an organ by William Hill dating from 1898. A specification of the organ can be found on the National Pipe Organ Register. There is also a small 5 stop chamber organ dating from 1870. The specification of the chamber organ can also be found on the National Pipe Organ Register.

List of organists

1881–93 T.J.Baker
1894–1930 Henry Holloway, D.Mus. FRCO
1930–35 Percy Whitlock
1936–66 Cyril Knight, FRCO, FLCM
1967–75 Spencer Fackerell
1976 Roger Hill
1976–82 Cyril Knight
1982–88  Ian Harrison, BA, FRCO, FTCL
1988–94 Anthony Wood, ARCO
1994– Ian Harrison

Gallery

See also

List of new ecclesiastical buildings by J. L. Pearson

References

Church of England church buildings in Dorset
Churches in Bournemouth
History of Hampshire
J. L. Pearson buildings
Grade I listed churches in Dorset
Gothic Revival church buildings in England
Bournemouth, Saint Stephen's